The Estrada de Ferro Cantagalo or Cantagalo Railway in Brazil operated from 1873 to 1965, and used the Fell mountain railway system, with equipment from the temporary Mont Cenis Pass Railway which closed in 1871. From 1883 the Fell rail was used for braking only. The line was built by British engineers and capital.

The railway, from Niterói to Nova Friburgo, was Brazil's first mountain railway. Curvature was severe, from  radius.

Four new locomotives were purchased from Manning Wardle of England, plus 14 (probably) from the Mont Cenis Pass Line. These locos were of limited capacity and expensive to maintain, and possibly affected by the Brazilian climate. They were replaced in 1883 by new 44-ton adhesion-only locomotives from the Baldwin Locomotive Works, though the Fell centre rail was retained for braking. Two North British Locomotive Company engines were bought in 1929.

The line became part of the Leopoldina Railway in 1911, and closed about 1965.

References

External links 
The Cantagallo Railway (scroll down to Nova Friburgo).

 (pp66–68; has maker's photo of Manning Wardle locomotive)

Metre gauge railways in Brazil
Mountain railways
Transport in Rio de Janeiro (state)